The ABU Radio Song Festival 2018 was the fifth edition of the ABU Radio Song Festivals, organised by the Asia-Pacific Broadcasting Union (ABU). It was held in the capital of Kazakhstan, Astana in July 2018 in the Kazmedia center.

Provisional list of participating countries

See also 
 ABU Song Festivals
 Asia-Pacific Broadcasting Union
 Eurovision Song Contest 2018
 Eurovision Young Musicians 2018
 Junior Eurovision Song Contest 2018

References

External links 
Official website

Radio 2018
2018 song contests